Hussain Sagar (alternatively referred to as Tank Bund) is a heart-shaped lake in Hyderabad, Telangana, built by Ibrahim Quli Qutb Shah in 1563. A large monolithic statue of the Gautama Buddha, erected in 1992, stands on Gibraltar Rock in the middle of the lake. It also separates the city centre of Hyderabad from its neighbourhood Secunderabad. The maximum depth of the lake is

History

Hussain Sagar was built across a tributary of the Musi river in 1563 by Ibrahim Quli Qutb Shah. The lake was named after Hussain Shah Wali, who was the Master of Architecture in the Kingdom. It is an artificial lake that holds water perennially fed by canals from Musi river. Hussain Sagar was the main source of water supply to Hyderabad before Himayat Sagar and Osman Sagar were built on river Musi.

The Buddha statue was chiseled out of a white granite rock, weighing 450 tons. It was carved by 200 sculptors for two years. The statue was transported to Hyderabad in November 1988. After initial problems, the statue was erected on 12 April 1992 on a red lotus pedestal.

Landmarks and attractions

The road on the Tank Bund was widened in 1946 when Sir Mirza Ismail was the prime minister of Hyderabad Deccan. Further widening and beautification of the Tank bund took place during 1987-88 by the then Chief Minister of Andhra Pradesh N.T.Rama Rao with the addition of fountains with dancing waters, tantalizing colored lights at night and bronze statues of renowned personalities.

Hussain Sagar Thermal Power Station 
Hussain Sagar Thermal Power Station was built in the year 1920 by the 7th Nizam Mir Osman Ali Khan on the banks of Hussain Sagar lake. It was the first thermal power station of South India. 
It supplied power to the twin cities of Hyderabad and Secunderabad from the year 1920 to the year 1983.

Patton Tank
The Pakistan M47 Patton tank is a war trophy given to the 54th Infantry Division who had disabled it during the Battle of Basantar in Pakistan, during 15–17 December 1971. It was given to the city by the battalion after the India Pakistan war of 1971.

Buddha statue

An 18-meter high monolithic statue of Lord Buddha towers over the lake from atop the Rock of Gibraltar. The idea was a part of the Buddha Poornima project in 1985 by N. T. Rama Rao. The statue was chiseled out of a white granite rock, weighing 450 tons. It was carved by 200 sculptors for two years. The statue was transported to Hyderabad in November 1988. After initial problems, the statue was erected on 12 April 1992 on a red lotus pedestal.

Lumbini Park

Lumbini Park is an urban park of  adjacent to Hussain Sagar. It has various attractions such as laser auditorium, boating facilities and musical fountains.

Birla Mandir

Birla Mandir refers to different Hindu temple built by the Birla family in different cities. The construction took ten years and was consecrated in 1976 by Swami Ranganathananda of Ramakrishna Mission.

Sanjeevaiah Park

Sanjeevaiah Park is a public green space and park located to the north of the lake.
after Damodaram Sanjivayya, former Chief Minister of Andhra Pradesh. The park is managed by the Hyderabad Metropolitan Development Authority and the park won the Best open landscape award during the 2010 Indian national trust for art and cultural heritage award presentations.

Prasads Multiplex
It is India's third IMAX theater. In November 2014, when Hollywood film Interstellar opened in theatres, Prasads was the only IMAX screen in India where the space drama was watched on 70mm film. The movie screen is said to be the largest IMAX screen (64 ft in height x 101.6 ft in width) in India and it is said to be fixed in Screen 6 of Prasad’s multi-plex.

Snow World

Snow World is an amusement park located beside Indira Park and along the Hussain Sagar lake. The park can accommodate a total of 2,400 visitors in a day. Said to be the first of its kind at any show theme park or snow dome in the world, the visitors are exposed to snowfall for ten minutes for every hour.

NTR Gardens

NTR Gardens is a small urban park of  adjacent to Hussain Sagar lake. Constructed in several phases since 1999, the park is presently being maintained by the Buddha Purnima Project Authority that functions under the directives of the Government of Telangana. The park is named after and houses the memorial of N T Rama Rao, a matinee idol and former Chief Minister of Andhra Pradesh who died on 18 January 1996.

Eat Street
Across the 10 km lakefront, spaces like Eat Street and Jalavihar Water Park are located. People check out Eat Street which serves meals, fast food and other eating options. An array of stalls serving everything from chaat and pizza to Mughlai and North Indian cuisine makes it a foodie's paradise.

Tomb of Saidani Maa Sahebaa

Sayedani Maa Tomb is an Archaeological Survey of India declared heritage site located at the north end of Hussain Sagar. Saidani Maa Saheba was a saint of the Nizam era. An example of Islamic architecture, the tomb has been carved intricately with marble latticework.

Dr Babasaheb Ambedkar Statue
The giant 125-foot-tall Dr Babasaheb Ambedkar Statue is being built across 11.4 acres, adjoining the banks of historic Hussain Sagar lake and the  new Telangana state secretariat. The statue of Dr B R Ambedkar stands tall in his signature pose atop the country’s parliament house, which takes the overall height to 175 feet. The circular edifice resembling the parliament of India will also house a museum, library and an audio-visual hall across a 20,000 sq ft area to commemorate the life and times of Dr Babasaheb Ambedkar.

Sailing
Hussain Sagar lake is a popular spot for sailing. Regattas have been held here since 1971 jointly by the EME Sailing Association and the Secunderabad Sailing Club. Hyderabad Sailing Week has been conducted here since 1984 when the first laser boats were introduced by the Laser Class Association of India. The event has grown from ten laser entries in 1984 to 110 laser entries in 2009. In August 2009 the lake was witness to the monsoon regatta in which sailors from all over India participated. Different classes of sailboats and yachts were raced including four J24, eighteen Hobie Cat and Forty-seven Optimist (dinghy).

The Yacht Club of Hyderabad located at Sanjeevaiah Park started in 2009 and instituted the Monsoon Regatta the same year. The club started with just three boats now boast of more than 45 on its premises including Lasers, Optimists, Omegas, Kayaks, and many safety and rescue vessels. The club trains youngsters to compete at the national level.

Statues of Icons in Tank Bund, Hyderabad

34 well-sculptured bronze statues, mounted on high platforms, of people who played iconic role in the development of Hyderabad and Telugu culture along the Tank Bund road. The following 34 personalities are commemorated in the order of appearance from Secunderabad.

Komaram BheemTribal leader from Telangana who openly fought against Nizam of Hyderabad with slogan Jal, jungal, zameen
Rudrama DeviThe 13th century Queen of the Kakatiya Dynasty which ruled over most parts of present-day Telangana and Andhra Pradesh
Mahbub Ali Khan, Asaf Jah VI 6th Nizam of the Asaf Jahi Dynasty
Sarvepalli RadhakrishnanFirst Vice President of India and second President of India
CR ReddyEducationist, political thinker, essayist, poet and literary critic
Gurajada ApparaoTelugu playwright, dramatist, poet, writer and humanist
Ballari Raghava Telugu playwright, thespian and film actor
Alluri Sita Rama Raju Indian Telugu revolutionary who fought against the British raj
Sir Arthur CottonBritish irrigation engineer instrumental in building the Prakasam Barrage, the Dowleswaram Barrage and the Kurnool Cuddappah Canal (K. C. Canal) 
Tripuraneni Ramaswamy Chowdary Telugu lawyer, poet, playwright, reformer, rationalist and humanist
Pingali VenkayyaIndian freedom fighter and the designer of the flag on which the Indian national flag was based
Kandukuri VeeresalingamSocial reformer and Telugu writer
Makhdoom MohiuddinUrdu poet, Marxist political activist and a forerunner of Telangana Rebellion against the Nizam of Hyderabad
Suravaram PratapareddySocial historian from Telangana
Gurram JashuvaTelugu poet and Dalit activist
 Mutnuri Krishna RaoIndian freedom fighter, editor, scholar and literary critic
 Sri Sri Telugu poet and lyricist
 Raghupathi Venkataratnam NaiduIndian social reformer
ThyagarajaRenowned composer of Carnatic music 
Ramadasu17th-century Indian devotee of Lord Rama and a composer of Carnatic music
Sri KrishnadevarayaThe Emperor of the Vijayanagara Empire who reigned from 1509 to 1529
 KshetrayyaTelugu poet and composer of Carnatic music
Potuluri Virabrahmendra Swami Hindu saint, who lived in Andhra Pradesh
Bramha NaiduMinister in a Medieval Andhra kingdom of Palnadu 
Molla Telugu poet who authored the Telugu-language Ramayana
Tana Shah Last ruler of the Qutb Shahi dynasty
Siddhendra YogiInventor of Modern form of Classical dance Kuchipudi 
Yogi VemanaTelugu poet and philosopher 
Potana Telugu poet best known for his translation of the Bhagavata Purana from Sanskrit to Telugu
Annamacharya15th-century Hindu saint and the earliest known Indian musician to compose songs called sankirtanas in praise of the Lord Venkateswara, a form of Vishnu
 Yerrapragada Medieval Telugu poet 
TikkanaSecond poet of the "Trinity of Poets (Kavi Trayam)" who translated Mahabharata into Telugu
Nannayya Telugu poet and the first in Trinity of poets (Kavitrayam), who authored Andhra Mahabharatam, a Telugu retelling of the Mahabharata.
Gautamiputra Satakarni (Shalivahanudu)Ruler of the Satavahana Empire in present-day Deccan region of India

Transport

Hussain Sagar is near to Khairatabad , Lakdi-Ka-Pul and Assembly Hyderabad metro stations. Hussain Sagar is also serviced by MMTS Train stations at Necklace Road, James Street and Sanjeevaiah Park. Necklace Road runs along the lake and connects important locations on its banks.

The Hussain Sagar Jn was a two platform railway station earlier but was dismantled in the mid-1980s. It is now a Railway controlling cabin with three routes diverging towards Hyderabad, Secunderabad, and Begumpet.

Suicides 
The lake has become a suicide spot, with 146+ deaths and 510+ suicide attempts between 2013 and 2016. A lack of a proper rescue team, and a low fence barrier has resulted in the high number of deaths.

International recognition

Heart of the world by UNWTO
Hussain Sagar, a heritage site of India was declared as the 'Heart of the World' by UNWTO on 27 September 2012, on the occasion of World Tourism Day, for being the World's Largest Heart-Shaped Mark, the World's Heritage Heart-Shaped Mark, and the World's Wonderful Heart-Shaped Mark on the face of the earth among the heart-shaped marks formed by the heart-shaped 
lakes and islands that exist in the world. Logo for the 'Heart of the World' was inaugurated by H.E. Mr. Taleb Rifai, Secretary-General, United Nations World Tourism Organisation (UNWTO), Madrid-Spain, in the year 2013.

World's Largest Heart-Shaped Mark
Hussain Sagar lake is the largest heart-shaped mark among the marks formed by 78 heart-shaped lakes and 9 heart-shaped islands on the face of the earth.

UNESCO world Heritage site tentative list
Hussain lake is one of the Qutub Shahi monuments of Hyderabad-Telangana, out of which Golconda Fort, Qutub Shahi Tombs, and Charminar were already placed in the tentative list of World Heritage Sites of UNESCO.

World's Wonderful Heart-Shaped Mark
This lake has many outstanding universal values of love around it in addition to its heart shape, the symbol of love, which explores the wonder of love in the world. King built the lake for his people's drinking & irrigation purpose out of his love towards his people. King Ibrahim named the lake after Hazrath Hussain Shawali (Sufi saint, medical practitioner and architect of the lake) as a sign of gratitude for Hussain's treatment that was given to the king during his sickness and made him recover from the sickness. Many historical monuments were placed on the bank.

Environmental conditions and conservation
Hussain Sagar Lake forms an important part of Hyderabad but now has become the main sewage collection zone of the twin cities of Hyderabad and Secunderabad. As a result of heavy anthropogenic pressures such as unplanned urbanization, the entire ecosystem of Hussain Sagar Lake has changed. The water quality has deteriorated considerably during the last three decades. The lake has become shallow due to siltation and accumulation of plant debris. A 2008 study of the lake's water and sediment has found that it has exceeded its eutrophic condition, reaching hypereutrophic status. Many undesirable changes in the structure of biological communities have resulted, and some important species have either declined or completely disappeared. Realizing the importance of conservation of Hussain Sagar Lake, a project has been formulated. This project shall be implemented by APPCB, Hyderabad, India. In this respect, a project feasibility report has been prepared for approval and financing. In spite of the commission of a sewage treatment plant on the western side, a large amount of untreated sewage and industrial effluents continue to flow into the lake.

See also
 Hyderabad city lakes

References

External links

 

Lakes of Hyderabad, India
Colossal statues in India
Artificial lakes of India
Water Heritage Sites in India